Carsun Chang (Shanghainese for (; 1886–1969), also known as Chang Chun-mai, was a prominent Chinese philosopher, public intellectual and political figure. Carsun Chang was a social democratic politician.

Biography
A pioneering theorist of human rights in the Chinese context, Chang established his own small "Third Force" democratic party during the Nationalist era.

Chang supported German-style social democracy while opposing capitalism, communism, and guild socialism. He supported socialization of major industries such as railroads and mines to be run by a combination of government officials, technicians, and consumers. The development of a mixed economy in China, like that advocated by the Social Democratic Party of Germany under Philipp Scheidemann.

Equipped with the traditional Confucian degree of xiucai or "accomplished scholar", Chang went on to study at Waseda University in Japan where he came under the influence of Liang Qichao's theory of constitutional monarchy.  In 1918 he accompanied Liang's tour of post-war Europe, later going to Germany to study philosophy for a short time at Berlin University.  While in Germany he came under the influence of the teachings of Rudolf Eucken (1846–1926) and Henri Bergson (1859–1941).   With Hans Driesch, who was formerly Eucken's student, Chang travelled throughout China in the early 1920s, serving as Driesch's Chinese translator as he lectured on Eucken's philosophical vision. In 1922, Chang led a committee which drafted an outline for a constitution with a federal system of government. In 1923 Chang gave a lecture at Tsinghua University, the title was "outlook on life (人生觀)". Soon after, his speech was published on Tsinghua weekly (淸華週刊), this led to polemics over science and metaphysics (also known as the "worldview controversy"). He wrote extensively on what now forms part of modern neo-Confucianism.

With Zhang Dongsun, he organized a National Socialist Party (not connected with the Nazis in Germany).  In 1933 he and Huang Yanpei organized the China Democratic League, a Third Force party with strong commitments to liberal doctrines of separation of powers, freedom of expression and human rights. The political scientist Qian Duansheng criticized Chang as "neither an organizer himself nor a man able to pick capable men to organize for him." John F. Melby, an American diplomat who knew Chang during the war, felt that Chang was as "unrealistic" as his brother, Chang Kia-ngau, was hard headed. As a scholar, Melby conceded, Chang was "highly intelligent and well educated," but as a politician he was "utopian" and "ineffectual." After the war against Japan, Chang became the chairman of the China Democratic Socialist Party.

Opposed to the Chinese communists, but also dissatisfied with Chiang Kai-shek's noncompliance with the constitution, Carsun Chang went to the United States after 1949.  The Democratic Socialist Party moved to Taiwan afterwards and continued resisting the implementation of a one-party dictatorship and oppression by the Kuomintang though its very survival in Taiwan was due to its tacit cooperation with the Kuomintang.  Carsun Chang reappeared in 1962 calling for the unity of the party, but returned to the United States before his death in 1969.

Family
Carsun Chang was the older brother of the prominent banker and politician Chang Kia-ngau (Zhang Jia'ao). His sister, Zhang Youyi, was an educator, banker, and the first wife of poet Xu Zhimo.

See also
Chinese philosophy

References

Works
Chang, Carsun.  The Third Force in China. New York: Bookman Associates, 1952.
Chang, Carsun. The Development of Neo-Confucian Thought. 2 vols. New York: Bookman Associates, 1957-1962. (Vol. 2)
Chang, Carsun. Wang Yang-ming: Idealist philosopher of sixteenth-century China. Jamaica, NY: St.  John's University Press, 1962.
Chang, Carsun, and Rudolf Eucken. Das Lebensproblem in China und in Europa. Leipzig: Quelle & Meyer, 1922.
Chang, Carsun, and Kalidas Nag.  China and Gandhian India. Calcutta: The Book Company, 1956.
Chang, Carsun et al. (1958). A Manifesto on the Reappraisal of Chinese Culture; Our Joint Understanding of the Sinological Study Relating to World Cultural Outlook.
Chang, Carsun. Guoxian yi (1921). In Xian Zheng zhi dao (Beijing: Qinghua daxue chubanshe, 2006a).
Chang, Carsun. Minzu fuxing de xueshu jichu (1935). Beijing: Zhongguo renmin daxue chubanshe, 2006b.
Chang, Carsun. Mingri zhi Zhongguo wenhua (1936). Beijing: Zhongguo renmin daxue chubanshe, 2006c.
Chang, Carsun. Li guo zhi dao (1938). In Xian Zheng zhi dao (Beijing: Qinghua daxue chubanshe, 2006d).
Chang, Carsun. Yili xue shi jiang gangyao (1955). Beijing: Zhongguo renmin daxue chubanshe, 2006.
Chang, Carsun. Bijiao Zhong Ri Yangming xue. Taipei: Taiwan shangwu yinshu guan, 1955.
Chang, Carsun. Bianzheng weiwu zhuyi bolun. Hong Kong: Youlian chubanshe, 1958.
Chang, Carsun. Zhongguo zhuanzhi junzhu zhengzhi pingyi. Taipei: Hongwen guan chubanshe, 1986.
Chang, Carsun. Rujia zhexue zhi fuxing. Beijing: Zhongguo renmin daxue chubanshe, 2006.
Chang, Carsun, and Wenxi Cheng. Zhong Xi Yin zhexue wenji. 2 vols. Taipei: Taiwan xuesheng shuju, 1970.
Chang, Carsun, and Huayuan Xue. Yijiusijiu nian yihou Zhang Junmai yanlun ji. Taipei : Daoxiang chubanshe, 1989.

Secondary sources

 

Xinzhong Yao, ed. (2003). RoutledgeCurzon Encyclopedia of Confucianism. London and New York: RoutledgeCurzon, Vol. 2, pp. 799–800.

External links

 "Zhang Junmai (Carsun Chang, 1877-1969)", Internet Encyclopedia of Philosophy.

1886 births
1969 deaths
China Democratic Socialist Party politicians
Academic staff of Yenching University
Academic staff of Tsinghua University
New Confucian philosophers
Republic of China politicians from Shanghai
Republic of China philosophers
Philosophers from Shanghai
Chinese emigrants to the United States
Waseda University alumni
Humboldt University of Berlin alumni